St. Bernard Cemetery is a Roman Catholic cemetery, which is located in Fitchburg, Massachusetts.

History
St. Bernard Cemetery dates from the early to mid-nineteenth century and remains very active as it serves several local parishes in and around Fitchburg. In recent years, new areas of the cemetery have been opened to accommodate more plots. The land is arranged by sections named for Catholic saints, as well for nearby street names.

Notable burials
 Nixey Callahan, Major League Baseball player
 James L. Conrad, president of Nichols College
 John T. Keefe, Major League Baseball player
 Pat Moran, Major League Baseball player
 Joseph Ward, 22nd Massachusetts Secretary of the Commonwealth

References

External links
 
 

Roman Catholic cemeteries in Massachusetts
Cemeteries in Worcester County, Massachusetts